The Ghost Patrol is a 1923 American silent romantic melodrama film directed by Nat Ross from a short story by Sinclair Lewis, produced and distributed by Universal Pictures. It starred Ralph Graves and Bessie Love and is now considered lost.

The film is a member of the Universal-produced and Carl Laemmle-selected "The Laemmle Nine", which also includes A Dangerous Game, The Flaming Hour, Kindled Courage, The Scarlet Car, The Power of a Lie, The First Degree, The Love Letter, and The Gentleman from America.

Plot 

In the neighborhood of "Little Hell", Terry Rafferty (Graves), a reformed thief, has fallen in love with Effie Kugler (Love) and is seeking her hand in marriage. Effie's father (Williams) refuses, which prompts Terry to get drunk and assault a politician. Terry is sent to prison.

Don Dorgan's (Nichols) 30-year career as a police officer ends when the new commissioner (MacDowell) decides that he is too old. Don realizes that the neighborhood still needs him, and wears his old uniform, becoming "The Ghost Patrol".

After serving his sentence, Terry is released from prison, and Don brings him to Effie, reuniting the couple. When the commissioner learns of the good that Don has been bringing to the neighborhood, he rehires him and promotes him.

Cast

Production 
Edith Roberts had originally been cast as the female lead.

Release and reception 
The film had its Los Angeles premiere at the Million Dollar Theater. Some theaters showed it with the short Dad's Boy, while others showed it the Baby Peggy short Sweetie.

Overall, the film received positive reviews. Bessie Love's performance was well-received, while Ralph Graves was deemed as miscast.

References

External links 

 
 
 
 

1923 drama films
1923 lost films
1923 films
American black-and-white films
1920s English-language films
American silent feature films
Films based on short fiction
Films based on works by Sinclair Lewis
Films directed by Nat Ross
Lost American films
Lost drama films
Melodrama films
Universal Pictures films
1920s American films
Silent American drama films